Danzey may refer to:

Danzey Green, a small hamlet in Warwickshire, England
Danzey railway station, a railway station in Warwickshire, England

People with the surname
Jack Danzey (1941–2020), Australian rugby league player, referee and administrator
Michael Danzey (born 1971), English footballer